Pitcairnia punicea is a species of flowering plant in the family Bromeliaceae, native to southeastern Mexico, Belize and Guatemala. It was first described by Michael Joseph François Scheidweiler in 1842.

References

punicea
Flora of Belize
Flora of Guatemala
Flora of Mexico
Plants described in 1842